Claxby may refer to the following places in Lincolnshire, England:

Claxby by Normanby, West Lindsey
Claxby St Andrew, East Lindsey
Claxby Pluckacre, East Lindsey